Aspen Hills, Gauteng is a gated suburb of Johannesburg, South Africa. It is located in Region F (former Region 9), south east of the city centre.

Aspen Hills is quite vast and is divided into "villages". Among these are Aspen Hills and Aspen Lakes.  The area is considered by some as a nature estate due to the strong preference and favour nature enjoys in this area.

References

External links 
 Aspen Nature
 Housing Estates
 Joburg's southern suburbs

Johannesburg Region F